This is a list of the national Australian Football teams in the world.

Note: In order to be recognised as a true national team and not simply ex-patriates, the list is subject to International Cup eligibility rules.

List

See also

 Geography of Australian rules football
 List of Australian Football Leagues outside Australia
 Australian Football International Cup
 List of International Australian rules football tournaments
 Australian rules football exhibition matches

References

National